Behnaz Farahi (Persian: بهناز فرهی , born 1985) is an Iranian-born American architect, designer and educator. She is best known for her designs of interactive wearables and installations.

Early life and education 
Behnaz Farahi was born and grew up in Tehran. As a child she started drawing and constructing mechanical devices. After finishing her studies of architecture at the Shahid Beheshti University and Azad University in Iran she moved to Los Angeles where she earned her second Master's degree at the USC School of Architecture. She holds a PhD in Interdisciplinary Media Arts and Practice from USC School of Cinematic Arts and is currently an assistant professor of design at California State University, Long Beach.

Career
In 2015 she developed a 3D printed cape titled "Caress of the Gaze" which reacts to the looks of others by opening and closing those parts of the garment which are being gazed at. The project received several awards such as the 2016 World Technology Design Award and the 2016 Fast Company Innovation by Design Linda Tischler Award. From a technical perspective, Farahi's works are based on computational design, digital fabrication, material computation and artificial intelligence. From a theoretical perspective, her work is also informed by feminism, neuroscience and cognitive philosophy.

Collections
Her work is in the permanent collection of the Museum of Science and Industry in Chicago.

In 2022, Behnaz Farahi created a cyber-physical robotic installation supported by Universal Robots for fashion brand ANNAKIKI Milan Fashion Week. The piece was entitled “Returning the Gaze” installation. The installation consisted of a wearable helmet type piece on a performance model with four screens displaying the model’s eyes. The four screens were mounted on moving robotic arms.

Awards 
2022 Honorable mention, Fast Company’s Innovation by Design, New York, USA 
2021 Winner, Cooper Hewitt Smithsonian Design Museum Digital Design Award, New York, USA 
2016 Winner,  World Technology Award in Design, WTN, Los Angeles, USA 
2016 Winner,  Innovation By Design Linda Tischler Award, Fast Company, New York, USA 
2016 Finalist for Responsive Design,  Interactive Innovation Award, SXSW 2016, Austin, USA
2013 Winner,  Kinetic Art Organization, Boynton Beach, USA 
2010 2nd Place, Mirmiran Competition, Tehran, Iran

Exhibitions 
2022 Returning the Gaze. Milan Fashion Week, ITALY 
2021 SIGGRAPH 2021 LOS ANGELES, USA 
2021 Generative Unfolding. MIT, Center for Art, Science & Technology (CAST) BOSTON, USA 
2020 Returning The Gaze. Ars Electronica LINZ, AUSTRIA 
2020 Returning The Gaze. Maiden, LA LOS ANGELES 
2020 Iridescence NYIT NYC 
2020 Can The Subaltern Speak? Elysium Gallery SWANSEA, WALES 
2019 Iridescence Museum of Science and Industry Chicago CHICAGO, USA 
2018 Mesolite adidas, Headquarter HERZOGENAURACH, GERMANY 
2017 Second Skin. Luminary, Future Fires & Midway SAN FRANCISCO, USA 
2017 Bodyscape & Synapse. Ars Electronica LINZ, AUSTRIA 
2017 Bodyscape. La piscine museum ROUBAIX, FRANCE 
2017 Look Forward Fashiontech Festival, La Gaité Lyrique  PARIS, FRANCE 
2017 Caress of the Gaze. YouFab Global Creative Awards Winning Works Exhibition TOKYO, JAPAN 
2017 Tomorrows: Urban fictions for possible futures ATHENS, GREECE 
2016 Caress of the Gaze. Radical atoms and alchemist of our time Exhibition at Ars Electronica LINZ, AUSTRIA 
2016 Screening Festival, Arts-Based Robotic TRIESTE, ITALY 
2016 3D-printed fashion show/exhibition for Lexus x Voxelworld show DÜSSELDORF, GERMANY 
2016 A+D Architecture and Design Museum LOS ANGELES, USA 
2016 Wearable Fashiontech Festival, La Gaité Lyrique PARIS, FRANCE 
2016 Synapse ACADIA 2016 MICHIGAN, USA

References 

Living people
1985 births
21st-century American architects
Iranian emigrants to the United States
American women architects
Shahid Beheshti University alumni
USC School of Architecture alumni
21st-century American women
Islamic Azad University alumni